Douro, Faina Fluvial (Labor on the Douro River) is a 1931 Portuguese documentary short film. It was the first film directed by Manoel de Oliveira and is a portrait of his hometown of Porto and the labor and industry that takes place along the city's main river, the Douro River. It was first shown at the International Congress of Film Critics in Lisbon on 19 September 1931, where the majority of the Portuguese audience booed. However, other foreign critics and artists who were in attendance praised the film, such as Luigi Pirandello and Émile Vuillermoz. Oliveira re-edited the film with a new soundtrack and re-released it in 1934. Again in 1994, Oliveira modified the film by adding a new, more avant-garde soundtrack by Luís de Freitas Branco.

Oliveira was influenced by German filmmaker Walther Ruttmann's documentary Berlin: Symphony of a City, and Douro, Faina Fluvial was made in the same genre of city symphony films.

References

External links 
 

1931 documentary films
1931 films
Black-and-white documentary films
Portuguese black-and-white films
Films directed by Manoel de Oliveira
Portuguese silent films
Documentary films about cities
Portuguese short documentary films
1930s short documentary films